Lucius Mummius (2nd century BC), was a Roman statesman and general. He was consul in the year 146 BC along with Scipio Aemilianus. Mummius was the first of his family to rise to the rank of consul thereby making him a novus homo. He received the agnomen  Achaicus for his victories over the Achaean League destroying  the famous ancient city of  Corinth, at that time a leading city of the League, as part of his campaign. Mummius' victory over the Achaean League and the sack of Corinth placed Rome firmly in control of all Greece from a political standpoint - something Rome had avoided doing even though their involvement in the Greek East dated back as far as 226 BC when they confronted Illyrian piracy.

Career
Almost nothing is known about Lucius Mummius' early career. He won one of the praetorships (for 154 BC) during the elections of 155 BC.

Hispania
In 154 BC the Senate assigned Mummius the task of restoring order in Hispania Ulterior (Further Spain), which was reeling from a revolt by native Lusitanian (the Lusitanian Rebellion of 155-150 BC). The rebellion was led by the Lusitanian chieftains  Punicus and Caesarus. In the initial phases of his campaign he experienced several reverses, but he regrouped and at Ocile he led his army of 9,000 foot and 500 horse in a victorious battle against a numerically superior force of Lusitanians, killing about 15,000 rebels and lifting the siege; his successor, Marcus Atilius, went on to take Oxthracae, the largest city in Lusitania. Mummius was awarded a triumph for his victory over the Lusitanians.

Corinth
Mummius was elected consul for 146 BC. He was appointed to take command of the Achaean War, inheriting the command from Metellus Macedonicus. Having obtained an easy victory over the incapable Achaean leader Diaeus, Mummius entered  Corinth after a victory over the defending forces. All the men of Corinth were put to the sword, the women and children were sold into slavery, and the statues, paintings and works of art were seized and shipped to Rome. Corinth was then reduced to ashes.  However, at least two ancient authors give accounts that suggest Corinth was not completely destroyed.  The apparently needless cruelty of Mummius in Corinth, is explained by Mommsen as due to the instructions of the senate, prompted by the mercantile party, which was eager to dispel a dangerous commercial rival. According to Polybius, Mummius was unable to resist the pressure of those around him.

In the subsequent settlement of affairs, Mummius exhibited considerable administrative powers and a high degree of justice and integrity, which gained him the respect of the inhabitants. He especially abstained from offending their religious sensibilities. On his return to Rome he was honored with a triumph, and was the first novus homo to receive an agnomen for military services.

Censor
In 142 BC he was censor with Scipio Aemilianus Africanus, whose severity frequently brought him into collision with his more lenient colleague.

Art
His indifference to works of art and ignorance of their value is shown by his well-known remark to those who contracted for the shipment of the treasures of Corinth to Rome, that "if they lost or damaged them, they would have to replace them." He was, in other words, unaware that a "new-for-old-deal" was inappropriate for such valuable antiques. Mummius plundered Corinth and sent home ship loads of its priceless art and rich furniture to Rome. For the theatrical pageants exhibited by him he erected a theatre with improved acoustical conditions and seats after the Greek model, thus marking a distinct advance in the construction of places of entertainment.

See also
 Achaean League
 Roman Greece
 Spurius Mummius, Lucius's brother

References

Sources
Velleius Paterculus, i.12

Attribution

2nd-century BC births
2nd-century BC deaths
2nd-century BC Roman consuls
Ancient Roman generals
Characters in Book VI of the Aeneid
Lucius, Achaicus
Roman censors
Roman Corinth
Roman governors of Hispania